The Zaca Fire was a wildfire that began burning in the San Rafael Mountains, northeast of the Santa Ynez Valley in Santa Barbara County, California. It was also the single largest wildfire of the 2007 California wildfire season. As of 2023, it is California's 12th-largest recorded fire in modern history. The fire was contained on September 4, 2007, with the fire being brought under control on October 29, 2007.

Fire

On July 4, 2007, at 10:53 AM PDT, the Zaca Fire was started as a result of sparks from a grinding machine on private property, which was being used to repair a water pipe. By August 12, progress was being made on the fire through the combined efforts of firefighters and aircraft. Firefighters were able to turn the direction of the fire away from the Paradise Road community.

The Zaca Fire neared containment on September 2. On September 4, 2007, the fire had cost $117 million to fight, and was 100% contained. Hotspots within the fire perimeter continued to burn for over another month, until the Zaca Fire was fully brought under control on October 29, 2007. Of the 43 non-fatal injuries 2 occurred when a helicopter assigned to the incident crashed.

Impacts
The fire had primarily burned away from populated areas in extremely steep and rugged areas of the San Rafael Mountains in the Los Padres National Forest and the Santa Ynez River Recreation Area.  It only destroyed one Forest Service outbuilding. Its impacts on the environment and area water resources are not yet fully known. Many trails and campgrounds in the Dick Smith Wilderness were destroyed. Since then, a number of them have been rebuilt.

See also

October 2017 California wildfires
Witch Fire
December 2017 California wildfires
Thomas Fire

References

External links

CDF—California Dept. Forestry: Maps of the Zaca Fire
California Fire News: daily coverage of the "Zaca Fire" wildland fire including fire perimeter maps, photos - Over 100 pages labeled "Zaca Fire" 
Associated Press: "Giant fire in Los Padres forest to cross into Ventura County"
Los Angeles Times - "Santa Barbara fire flares anew"
Santa Maria Times - "Zaca Fire takes unexpected turn".
Southern California's Worst Brush Fires

2007 California wildfires
Los Padres National Forest
Mt. Pinos Ranger District, Los Padres National Forest
Santa Barbara Ranger District, Los Padres National Forest
Santa Lucia Ranger District, Los Padres National Forest
History of Santa Barbara County, California
San Rafael Mountains
Wildfires in Santa Barbara County, California